Die Sendung mit dem Elefanten (The Program with the Elephant) is a German television series and a spin-off of Die Sendung mit der Maus. It follows the story of a blue elephant and his friend, a pink rabbit.

See also
List of German television series

External links
 

2007 German television series debuts
2010s German television series
German children's television series
Television series with live action and animation
German television spin-offs
German-language television shows
Television series about elephants
Television series about rabbits and hares